Marinetti is a surname. Notable with this surname include:

 Antonio "Il Chiozzotro" Marinetti (born 1700), Italian painter
 Sorelle Marinetti, an Italian trio of three males singers in travesti fashion
 Filippo Tommaso Marinetti (1876-1944), Italian art theorist and founder of the Futurist movement
 Julien Marinetti (born 1967), French painter, sculptor and visual artist

See also 
 Marini

it:Marinetti